Andrew Glacier is a glacier  long, flowing northeast into Ognen Cove in Charcot Bay immediately west of the Webster Peaks on Trinity Peninsula, northern Graham Land.

History
Andrew Glacier was charted in 1948 by the Falkland Islands Dependencies Survey (FIDS) who named the feature for Dr. James Darby Andrew, medical officer at the FIDS Hope Bay station in 1946–47.

See also
 List of glaciers in the Antarctic
 Glaciology

Maps
Antarctic Digital Database (ADD). Scale 1:250000 topographic map of Antarctica. Scientific Committee on Antarctic Research (SCAR). Since 1993, regularly upgraded and updated.

References 

Glaciers of Davis Coast